Catherine Fillol (or Filliol; c. 1507 – c. 1535), Lady Seymour, was the daughter and co-heiress of Sir William Fillol (or Filliol; 1453 – 9 July 1527), of Woodlands, Horton, Dorset, and of Fillol's Hall, Essex.

She became the first wife of Sir Edward Seymour, who went on to become the first Duke of Somerset of a new creation, Lord Protector of England and the uncle of King Edward VI, after his sister Jane married King Henry VIII. A 17th-century marginal note to copy of Vincent's Baronage at College of Heralds alleged that she had had an affair with her father-in-law, Sir John Seymour. 
However, there is no contemporary evidence to support this. Catherine Fillol may have gone to a local convent, as this seems to be implied by a remark in her father's will. The will was challenged by Sir Edward Seymour in 1531, on the basis that his father-in-law was not of sound mind. In 1535, Sir Edward Seymour married his second wife, Anne Stanhope, indicating that Catherine Fillol had probably died no later than early 1535.

Catherine Fillol had two sons, John Seymour (buried 19 December 1552), who died unmarried and without issue, and Edward Seymour.

Edward Seymour had ten more children by his second wife, including his eventual heir Edward Seymour, 1st Earl of Hertford. When he was later created Duke of Somerset, his  children by his first marriage were still considered legitimate, but the patent of nobility provides that the dukedom is to descend first to his heirs by Anne, and only in the event of the failure of that line to his heirs by Catherine. With the death of Algernon, the seventh duke of Somerset in 1750, the Seymour Baronets of Berry Pomeroy Castle inherited the title of Duke of Somerset. Consequently, the present Duke of Somerset is descended from Catherine Filliol.

References

1507 births
Year of death missing
16th-century English women
Wives of knights